John Peers and John-Patrick Smith were the defending champions but decided not to participate together.
Peers played alongside Jamie Murray, Smith partnered up with Samuel Groth. Both pairs lost to Marcelo Demoliner and Franko Škugor in the first and second round, respectively.
Chris Guccione and Matt Reid defeated Purav Raja and Divij Sharan 6–3, 7–5 in the final to win the title.

Seeds

Draw

Draw

References
 Main Draw

Torneo Internacional AGT - Doubles
2013 Doubles